John William King (born 9 August 1932) is an English former footballer who played in the Football League for Cardiff City, Crewe Alexandra and Stoke City.

King began his career with his local side Crewe Alexandra in 1950. He formed a good partnership with Frank Blunstone and the pair were highly wanted by other clubs. King joined Stoke City for £8,000 and soon began to show his worth. He spent eight seasons at the Victoria Ground making 311 appearances scoring 113 goals to become one of the club's greatest goalscorers. He later played for Cardiff City and made a return to his home town team, Crewe Alexandra.

Career
Despite his somewhat 'chunky' build, King was considered to be an excellent goal scorer. He started his career at his local side Crewe Alexandra, where he partnered Frank Blunstone who was later capped by England. When Blunstone left for Chelsea King decided to join Stoke City, who were at the time in the Second Division. He immediately began to score goals and quickly became a firm fan favourite. Season after season, he scored regularly for Stoke and became one of the few Stoke players to score more than 100 League goals.

King was a natural left footer who was a very skilful player and, at 5'7" (1.70 m) not the typical forward in the 1950s, but his ability to lead the attacking line was undeniable. A regular scorer, he topped the scorer charts at Stoke in three seasons amassing 113 goals for the club in all competitions placing him as Stoke's fifth all-time top goalscorer.

He later joined Cardiff City and returned to Crewe Alexandra where he helped win promotion in 1963. After retirement from football King went on play tennis and almost qualified for the Wimbledon Championships in 1970.

Career statistics
Source:

References

External links
 
 Johnny King Audio interview at BBC.co.uk

English footballers
Stoke City F.C. players
Crewe Alexandra F.C. players
Cardiff City F.C. players
English Football League players
1932 births
Living people
Association football forwards